

Current

 - Indicates part of the lead team that appears on the Sunday version (which serves as the pregame show to Sunday Night Baseball).

Notable former on-air staff

 - Indicates formerly part of Lead Team

References 

Lists of Major League Baseball broadcasters
ESPN people